Pam's Place Airport  is a public-use airport  in Putnam County, Indiana, United States. It is located three nautical miles (6 km) southwest of Eminence, an unincorporated town in Adams Township, Morgan County.

Facilities and aircraft 
It has two runways, both with a turf surface. One is designated 10/28, measuring 3,630 by 100 feet (1,106 x 30 m). The other is designated 18/36, measuring 1,629 by 100 feet (497 x 30 m).

For the 12-month period ending December 31, 2019, the airport had 3,850 general aviation aircraft operations, an average of about 10 per day. At that time there were 20 aircraft based at this airport: 35% single-engine, 20% helicopter and 45% ultralight.

References

External links 
 Aerial photo from Indiana DOT
 Aerial photo from USGS The National Map
 

Airports in Indiana
Transportation buildings and structures in Putnam County, Indiana